"Memories of a Broken Promise" was a hit for Canadian group Motherlode in 1969. It was their second charting single.

Background
The follow up to their hit "When I Die", Motherlode released "Memories of a Broken Promise" which was written by Dianne Brooks. It was released in Canada on Revolver REVS 004 and in the US on Buddah 144. This being their second hit, it puts to rest the myth that Motherlode was a one hit wonder band. It would eventually be one the BMI Canada Certificate of Honour winners of 1969.<ref>Billboard, May 23, 1970 - Page 60 Announcing the 1969 winners of the second annual BMI CANADA LIMITED CERTIFICATES OF HONOUR</ref>
Chart performance

Canada
By November 5, 1969, the song had moved from #49 to #38 on the WMCA Radio 57 Survey chart.  By November 22, the song was at #4 on the RPM''  Canadian Content Chart and at #55 on the Canadian National chart.   It made it to the Canadian Top 40,   peaking at #25 on the CHUM Charts, and #40 on the RPM Charts.

United States
By the end of November the song was also charting in the US.  The song would spend a total of two weeks in the US charts, peaking at #99 on the CASH BOX Top 100 Singles chart. On the Bubbling Under Hot 100 charts, " Memories Of A Broken Promise" got as far as #116 while the B side "What Does It Take (To Win Your Love?)" got to #111.

References

Links
 US Hot 100 Bubbling Under

Motherlode (band) songs
1969 songs
1969 singles
Revolver Records singles
Songs written by Dianne Brooks